Ibu Mertuaku (literally "My Mother In-Law") is a 1962 Singaporean melodrama film directed by and starring silver-screen legend P. Ramlee. The film's story revolves around the tragic love affair between Kassim Selamat, a poor musician, and Sabariah, the only daughter of a wealthy woman.

The movie is notable in that the opening act starts out as a light-hearted romantic comedy, but at the 30 minute mark turns into a dramatic tragedy. Like a number of P. Ramlee's works, the film criticises the unofficial caste system that separates the wealthy from the poor. This film is considered a Malaysian classic, not only for some of its songs - notably "Di Mana Kan Ku Cari Ganti" - but also for its depiction of a famous tragedy-induced eye-stabbing scene during the film's climax.

Plot
Set in 1960s Singapore, Sabariah Mansoor is a young woman who is fascinated with the music of Kassim Selamat, a small-time musician with great talent playing the saxophone. After one of his radio performances, Sabariah calls in to the studio to talk to him personally and express her admiration. They arrange to meet and it is love at first sight.

Sabariah's wealthy widowed mother Nyonya Mansoor wants Sabariah to marry Dr. Ismadi, an eye doctor, and is shocked when Sabariah tells her that she wants to marry Kassim Selamat. Nyonya Mansoor tells Sabariah that if she chooses Kassim, she will forfeit all her family's wealth and can never set foot in their house again. Sabariah still chooses Kassim, so Nyonya Mansoor arranges a quick marriage ceremony for the pair, after which she gives them 5000 ringgit and casts them out of the house.

Kassim and Sabariah move to Penang to start a new life. They are happy for a while, but soon all their money is used up and they have to live as paupers. Kassim wants to make money performing music, but Sabariah is against the idea as she thinks that she can make amends with her mother if Kassim renounces music forever. Kassim is forced to work as a labourer.

One day Kassim returns to their lowly home to see Sabariah crying in the arms of her mother. Nyonya Mansoor says that she would like to take Sabariah back to Singapore and care for her until she has given birth to the child she is pregnant with. Kassim lets Sabariah go, believing that she will return to him.

Months pass, during which Sabariah is cared for in comfort and under the wing of Nyonya Mansoor and Dr. Ismadi. She eventually gives birth to a baby boy who is named Tajudin. At this time, Kassim receives a telegram from Nyonya Mansoor saying that Sabariah died during childbirth. Kassim falls into depression, crying for days without end and refusing to work. Unknown to him, Sabariah is alive and waiting for him in Singapore. Nyonya Mansoor's fake telegram was part of her plan to separate the pair.

Sabariah eventually divorces Kassim, believing that he abandoned her and their child. She also agrees to marry Dr. Ismadi. Sabariah and Dr. Ismadi agree to keep the identity of Tajudin's birth father a secret from everyone, including Tajudin himself.

During this time, Kassim's endless crying has rendered him completely blind. He cannot pay the rent, and he is sent out into the street, blind and wandering aimlessly. Kassim is eventually found by Mami, a kind middle-aged woman who takes him into her home. Kassim then meets Mami's daughter, Chombi, who has just recently lost her husband. The pair find friendship as they mourn their respective loved ones.

Kassim eventually reveals his talent with the saxophone, and after being encouraged by Mami and Chombi, starts a new career in music using the stage name "Osman Jailani". Kassim, under the guise of Osman Jailani, becomes a hit and starts touring around all over Malaya, performing in Penang, Taiping, Ipoh, Kuala Lumpur, Seremban, Malacca, Muar, Batu Pahat, Johor Bahru before arriving in Singapore, where Sabariah and her new husband Dr. Ismadi attend his performance.

When Sabariah sees her former husband, now blind, performing on stage, she is overcome with sadness. She asks her new husband to fix Kassim's eyes without charge. The operation is a success, and Kassim, Mami and Chombi are all invited to stay at Dr. Ismadi's home with Sabariah and son while Kassim recovers. When Kassim's eye bandages are removed and he sees Sabariah at Dr. Ismadi's side, he has a moment of panic. Dr. Ismadi says that she cannot possibly be his dead wife but just a lookalike, which Kassim reluctantly accepts.

Kassim goes to Nyonya Mansoor's house, asking her for permission to see his son. Nyonya Mansoor tells him that she gave the boy away, so Kassim begs her to let him at least see Sabariah's grave. Nyonya Mansoor takes him to a grave, but when he realises that it's not Sabariah's grave, he realises the truth and curses Nyonya Mansoor for her evildoing.

Kassim returns to Dr. Ismadi's house where he confronts them with the truth just before entering his room and locking the door. Dr. Ismadi, Nyonya Mansoor and Sabariah beat at his locked door, begging for forgiveness. Kassim ignores them, and takes a pair of forks which he uses to pierce his eyes. Kassim then finally opens the door, once again blind and with streaks of blood flowing from his eyes. Nyonya Mansoor collapses when she sees him.

Kassim wanders out of the house until he bumps into Chombi, who is shocked to see his condition. He asks her to take him back to Penang with her, and they go, leaving Sabariah crying as she watches Kassim leave and Dr. Ismadi looking at his tearful wife pensively.

Cast
 P. Ramlee as Kassim Selamat
 Sarimah as Sabariah Mansoor
 Mak Dara as Nyonya Mansoor
 Ahmad Mahmud as Doctor Ismadi
 K. Fatimah as Salbiah
 Ahmad Nisfu as 'Mamak' Mahyudin Jelani
 Zainon Fiji as Mami, Chombi's mother
 Zaiton as Kalsom Bee also known as Chombi
 Ahmad C as Husin Jalal (Double Bassist)
 Ali Fiji as Bayen, Chombi’s neighbour, a saxophone learner.
 Rahimah Alias as Hayati Ismadi
 Shariff Dol as Abidin
 M. Zain as Abang Ali 
 Kuswadinata as Bidin 
 M. Babjan as Tok Kadi
 A. Rahim as Osman Hashim (Drummer)
 Hashim Salleh as Hashim Hassan (2nd Saxophonist)
 Kassim Masdor as Ramlan Hadi (Pianist)
 S. Sudarmaji as Salleh Idham (Accordionist)
 Omar Suwita as En. Murad (Radio Singapura Broadcaster)
 M. Rafiee as Nyonya Mansoor’s relative
 Nisyah Raguan as Makcik Bawang

Songs
 Jangan Tinggal Daku (Don't Leave Me)
 Di Mana Kan Ku Cari Ganti (Where Can I Find a replacement)
 Jeritan Batinku (The Screams of my Soul)

Awards and nominations
10th Asia Pacific Film Festival 1963
 Best Black & White Photography (Abu Bakar Ali)
 Special Award - Most Versatile Talent (P. Ramlee)

Impact
Mak Dara, who played the wicked mother-in-law of the title, has recalled in various Malaysian documentaries that upon the release of the film, response was so good that random people would stop her in the street to scold her or spit on her.

Censorship
In the recent release of the film on VCD, the scene where Kassim Selamat stabs his eyes with forks has been edited. After Kassim turns away from the camera, the scene then cuts straight to the door opening with Sabariah and Nyonya Mansoor waiting outside. The intermediate shot of Kassim turning back to the camera with blood streaming from his eyes has been removed completely. It is currently unknown if the film will be re-released with this scene intact. The scene is uncut in the recent television broadcast on Astro Prima

Jangan Tinggal Daku
The opening song Jangan Tinggal Daku was re-used as the title song in a later P. Ramlee film  Jangan Tinggal Daku. The two films are unrelated, but are similar in style and feature a number of the same cast and crew members.

Pop culture references
The film is referred to in another P. Ramlee film Labu dan Labi, where one of the title characters spoofs the eye-stabbing scene and directly refers to "Kassim Selamat".

The film has also more recently been referenced in the KRU song Gerenti Beres with the line, "Katakan kau seorang doktor, majistret atau lawyer, ahli musik tak main" ("Say that you are a doctor, magistrate or lawyer; musicians are useless"). This refers to the Nyonya Mansoor's belief that Kassim Selamat, a musician, is more lowly than doctors (specifically Dr. Ismadi in the film), as well as magistrates and lawyers. Nyonya Mansoor's oft-quoted line in the film goes, "Siapa Kassim Selamat? Lawyer, majistret?" ("Who is Kassim Selamat? A lawyer, a magistrate?")

References

External links
 Ibu Mertuaku / 1962 - Filem Malaysia
 Ibu Mertuaku at SinemaMalaysia.com
 

1960s musical drama films
1962 films
Melodrama films
Malaysian black-and-white films
Singaporean black-and-white films
Malay-language films
Malaysian drama films
Singaporean drama films
Films directed by P. Ramlee
Films about social class
Films with screenplays by P. Ramlee
Films scored by P. Ramlee
Malay Film Productions films
Films shot in Singapore
Films set in Singapore
Films set in the 1960s
1962 drama films